The Eighteenth Brumaire of Louis Napoleon is an essay written by Karl Marx between December 1851 and March 1852, and originally published in 1852 in Die Revolution, a German monthly magazine published in New York City and established by Joseph Weydemeyer. Later English editions, such as an 1869 Hamburg edition, were entitled The Eighteenth Brumaire of Louis Bonaparte.

The essay discusses the French coup of 1851 in which Louis-Napoléon Bonaparte assumed dictatorial powers. It shows Marx in his form as a social and political historian, treating actual historical events from the viewpoint of his materialist conception of history.

The title refers to the Coup of 18 Brumaire in which Napoleon Bonaparte seized power in revolutionary France (9 November 1799, or 18 Brumaire Year VIII in the French Republican Calendar), in order to contrast it with the coup of 1851.

Contents of the book 
In the preface to the second edition of The Eighteenth Brumaire, Marx stated that the purpose of this essay was to "demonstrate how the class struggle in France created circumstances and relationships that made it possible for a grotesque mediocrity to play a hero's part."

This essay contains the most famous formulation of Marx's view of the role of the individual in history, often translated as: "Men make their own history, but they do not make it as they please; they do not make it under self-selected circumstances, but under circumstances existing already, given and transmitted from the past."

The Eighteenth Brumaire presents a taxonomy of the mass of the bourgeoisie, which Marx says impounded the republic like its property, as consisting of: the large landowners, the aristocrats of finance and big industrialists, the high dignitaries of the army, the university, the church, the bar, the academy, and the press.

It also shows more criticism of the proletariat than is typical of his other works, referring to the bureaucracy as a "giant parasitic body" and describing widespread perceptions of the proletariat as a "party of anarchy, socialism, and communism," a party paradoxically established on precepts of an oppositional "party of order."

Impact on the development of Marxism 
Along with Marx's contemporary writings on English politics and The Civil War in France, the Eighteenth Brumaire is a principal source for understanding Marx's theory of the capitalist state.

Marx's interpretation of Louis Bonaparte's rise and rule is of interest to later scholars studying the nature and meaning of fascism. Many Marxist scholars regard the coup as a forerunner of the phenomenon of 20th-century fascism.

First as tragedy, then as farce
The opening lines of the book are the source of one of Marx's most quoted and misquoted statements, that historical entities appear two times, "the first as tragedy, then as farce" (das eine Mal als Tragödie, das andere Mal als Farce), referring respectively to Napoleon I and to his nephew Louis Napoleon (Napoleon III):

Hegel remarks somewhere that all great world-historic facts and personages appear, so to speak, twice. He forgot to add: the first time as tragedy, the second time as farce. Caussidière for Danton, Louis Blanc for Robespierre, the Montagne of 1848 to 1851 for the Montagne of 1793 to 1795, the nephew for the uncle. And the same caricature occurs in the circumstances of the second edition of the Eighteenth Brumaire.

Marx's sentiment echoed an observation made by Friedrich Engels at exactly the same time Marx began work on this book. In a letter to Marx of 3 December 1851, Engels wrote from Manchester:

.... it really seems as though old Hegel, in the guise of the World Spirit, were directing history from the grave and, with the greatest conscientiousness, causing everything to be re-enacted twice over, once as grand tragedy and the second time as rotten farce, Caussidière for Danton, L. Blanc for Robespierre, Barthélemy for Saint-Just, Flocon for Carnot, and the moon-calf together with the first available dozen debt-encumbered lieutenants for the little corporal and his band of marshals. Thus the 18th Brumaire would already be upon us.

Yet this motif appeared even earlier, in Marx's 1837 unpublished novel Scorpion and Felix, this time with a comparison between the first Napoleon and King Louis Philippe:

Every giant ... presupposes a dwarf, every genius a hidebound philistine....  The first are too great for this world, and so they are thrown out.  But the latter strike root in it and remain....  Caesar the hero leaves behind him the play-acting Octavianus, Emperor Napoleon the bourgeois king Louis Philippe....

Marx's comment is most likely about Hegel's Lectures on the Philosophy of History (1837), Part III : The Roman World, Section II: Rome from the Second Punic War to the Emperors, regarding Caesar:

But it became immediately manifest that only a single will could guide the Roman State, and now the Romans were compelled to adopt that opinion; since in all periods of the world a political revolution is sanctioned in men’s opinions, when it repeats itself. Thus Napoleon was twice defeated, and the Bourbons twice expelled. By repetition that which at first appeared merely a matter of chance and contingency becomes a real and ratified existence.

See also
Band of the 10th of December
Marxist philosophy
Bonapartism

Footnotes

Further reading
 Margaret A. Rose, Reading the Young Marx and Engels: Poetry, Parody, and the Censor. London: Croon Helm, 1978.
Mark Cowling and James Martin (editors), Marx’s Eighteenth Brumaire (Post)modern Interpretations. London: Pluto Books, 2002.

External links
The Eighteenth Brumaire of Louis Napoleon (Chapters 1 & 7 translated by Saul K. Padover from the German edition of 1869; Chapters 2 through 6 are based on the third edition, prepared by Friedrich Engels (1885), as translated and published by Progress Publishers, Moscow, 1937.)
Preface to the Second Edition (1869)
The Eighteenth Brumaire of Louis Bonaparte, Charles H. Kerr, Chicago, 1907.
The Eighteenth Brumaire Of Louis Bonaparte, International Publishers, New York City, 1963.

1852 essays
1869 books
History books about France
Communist books
Books by Karl Marx
19th-century history books
Napoleon III
Works originally published in German magazines
Historical materialism